0151 may refer to:
 The telephone dialling code for the city of Liverpool
 The debut album by Liverpool band The Night Café